Martin Wilson may refer to:

Martin Wilson (artist), Australian artist
Martin Wilson (writer), American writer
Martin Wilson, British musician formerly with the band Flux of Pink Indians